Tevye and His Seven Daughters (translit. Tuvia Vesheva Benotav) is a 1968 Israeli drama film directed by Menahem Golan. Based on stories by Sholem Aleichem, which were also the basis for the stage musical and 1971 film, both titled Fiddler on the Roof.

Plot
The film is about a poor Russian Jew named Tevye who tries to make a living. When he slowly lands money, he attempts to get his daughters married.

Cast

 Shmuel Rodensky as Tevye
 Betty Segal as Golda, his wife
 Ninet Dinar as Zeitl
 Avital Paz as Hodl
 Judith Solé as Sprinza
 Tikva Mor as Chava
 Mira-Gan-Mor as Bailke
 Robert Hoffmann as Fyodor
 Peter van Eyck as Priest
 Wolfgang Kieling as Poperilli
 as Menahem-Mendl

Release
The film was listed to compete at the 1968 Cannes Film Festival, but the festival was cancelled due to the events of May 1968 in France.

References

External links

1968 films
1968 romantic drama films
Israeli drama films
West German films
1960s Hebrew-language films
Films about Jews and Judaism
Films directed by Menahem Golan
Films set in Russia
Films set in the 1900s
Interfaith romance films
Adaptations of works by Sholem Aleichem
Films about Orthodox and Hasidic Jews
Films produced by Menahem Golan
Films with screenplays by Menahem Golan